The action of 28 October 2007 was part of Operation Enduring Freedom - Horn of Africa, the military operation defined by the United States for combating terrorism in the Horn of Africa. The incident occurred when United States Navy units acted to interdict piracy in the region.

Background
After a decrease in piracy in the first half of 2007, Somali pirates rebounded and again started to increase their attacks on shipping off the coast of Somalia.

Military confrontation
After receiving a distress call, an American , arrived at the scene and attacked and sank two skiffs being towed by the tanker. The tanker's owner and operator, Dorval Kaiun Shipping, reported that its cargo consisted of four kinds of chemicals, including highly flammable benzene. The United States Fifth Fleet spokesperson, Lydia Roberts, stated, "we were aware of what was on the ship when we fired".

As the hijacked tanker continued underway, Porters sister ship  received authorization from Somali authorities to pursue it. This is the first incident of Somali piracy where the United States Navy was given permission for pursuit within Somali territorial waters. The Navy continued to shadow the vessel through October and November, 2007. One of the crewmembers escaped from the ship and made it to safety, angering the pirates and complicating the situation even further.

In November negotiations started for the tanker's release, but by 4 December Golden Nori had been cornered in the port of Bosasso by two American and one German ship. Coalition forces called on the pirates to surrender, threatening them with military force if the standoff continued. The pirates in return demanded one million dollars in ransom or else they would kill all 21 members of the crew. On 12 December, the pirates left the vessel for the coast and set the crew free. It is still unclear if the pirates received their demanded ransom, or left simply because of the pressure applied by the coalition.

Similar incident

Another hijacking in the same region occurred late on 29 October when gunmen attacked the North Korean freighter Dai Hong Dan. The freighter's crew subsequently overwhelmed the gunmen, killing at least one and detaining the rest. With the permission of the freighter's crew, US Navy forces boarded the freighter to treat the wounded, which included three crewmen and three pirates. This hijacking may not have been the work of indiscriminate area pirates; the hijackers are believed to be security guards hired by the freighter's shipping agent.

Aftermath

After the release of Golden Nori, the US Navy started pressuring pirates on other vessels to release their captives and flee. Not too long after the release of Golden Nori all other vessels were released, some after US warships threatened to use force to remove the pirates on them. Some of the pirates fled without taking any ransoms, but it appears that others were indeed given ransom payments before leaving the ships they had taken. American ships escorted the freed vessels out of Somali waters and provided assistance to the crews of those vessels. All vessels were freed and no vessel was captured by pirates for a matter of months after the release of Golden Nori, allowing for a short period of peace along the coast.

References

Naval battles involving pirates
Maritime incidents in 2007
Conflicts in 2007
Naval battles of Operation Enduring Freedom
Piracy in Somalia
Anti-piracy battles involving the United States
October 2007 events in Africa